A special election was held in California's 50th congressional district to choose a new member of the U.S. Representative to fill the vacancy caused by the resignation of Republican Randy Cunningham, who resigned November 28, 2005 after pleading guilty to bribery, wire fraud, mail fraud, and tax evasion charges. (On March 3, 2006, he was sentenced to eight years and four months in federal prison).

The special primary election was held on April 11, 2006. A candidate who received a majority of the vote would have served out the rest of Cunningham's term. As no candidate won a simple majority, the top vote-getters in each party, Democrat Francine Busby and Republican Brian Bilbray, competed in a runoff special general election held on June 6, 2006, the same day that primaries were held for the November 2006 general election.

Bilbray won the special election 49 percent to 45 percent and was sworn in as a U.S. Representative on June 13, 2006. In the June 6 primary election for the November 2006 election, both candidates won their party's nomination. In the November 2006 general election rematch, Bilbray won re-election.

National implications
Because the 50th is considered to be a heavily Republican district, it would have been considered major news if Busby had won.  "This is a biggie," said Carl Luna, a political science professor at San Diego's Mesa College. "Everyone is going to be reading the tea leaves as a predictor of November." For that reason, the National Republican Congressional Committee spent $5 million on this race.

Controversies 
During the campaign, Arizona Senator John McCain cancelled a planned fundraiser for Bilbray at the last minute, after Bilbray criticized McCain's immigration bill as "amnesty" for illegal immigrants.

On June 2, five days before the special congressional election, Busby was recorded telling a largely Hispanic group that "You can all help--you don't need papers for voting, you don't need to be a registered voter to help." This comment was in response to a question by a man who asked in Spanish, "I want to help, but I don't have papers."
The recording was circulated over the Internet and on radio. Republicans claimed Busby was encouraging people to vote illegally, while Busby claimed she misspoke and meant that a person does not need to be a registered voter to help her campaign (such as phoning registered voters).

A number of irregularities in the election were alleged, including the swearing in of Bilbray by a member of his own party 17 days before the election was certified, "electronic voting machines sent out to the homes and cars of volunteers for up to 12 days prior to the election, and irregular election results like huge mega-precincts of absentee ballots where turnout was thousands of percent more than registered voters."  The Democratic National Committee's Voting Rights Institute raised several concerns about the fairness and accuracy of the vote count.  An election contest lawsuit sought a hand recount. The court dismissed the suit on the basis that, once the House of Representatives had sworn in Bilbray, the court lacked jurisdiction to hear the challenge.

Post Special-Election analysis 
Political analyst Larry Sabato wrote in his Crystal Ball newsletter: "What a difference four percentage points makes! That was Bilbray's margin over Busby, a gaffe-prone, lackluster candidate who was out of her league. With six years (1995–2001) under his belt from another California House district, former congressman Bilbray understood what it took to win a tough campaign, and riding the immigration issue, he did so. The DCCC forced the NRCC to pull out all the stops and spend a large fortune for Bilbray, but given the dam that might have burst had Busby won, it was worth every GOP penny for them."

Run-off and Primary elections
The June 6, 2006 run-off was held at the same time as the primary election for the biennial November 7, 2006 general election.  This created a peculiar opportunity for voters to vote on the same ballot for two different people for the same post; one to immediately fill the vacant seat, the other to run in the November election.

Polling

Results
On April 11, Democrat Francine Busby garnered 43.63 percent of the vote, 6.38 percentage points short of the majority necessary to avoid a runoff race.  She faced the leading vote getter from the two other parties participating: Republican Brian Bilbray and Libertarian Paul King, as well as independent candidate William Griffith, in a June 6 runoff.

In the June 6 runoff, Bilbray received a plurality with 78,341 votes (49.30%) to become the district's congressman for the remainder of the 109th Congress (until January 3, 2007).

For the new term beginning in 2007, the primaries were held on June 6, 2006, concurrent with the special election.  Busby and Bilbray each captured their party's nomination (as did Libertarian Paul King and Peace and Freedom candidate Miriam E. Clark). In the November, 2006 general election, Bilbray was again declared the winner.

See also
List of special elections to the United States House of Representatives

References

External links
 New  York Times article on the results

California 2006 50
California 2006 50
2006 50 Special
California 50 Special
United States House of Representatives 50 Special
United States House of Representatives 2006 50